Pokrovsky District is an administrative and municipal district (raion), one of the twenty-four in Oryol Oblast, Russia. It is located in the southeastern central part of the oblast. Its administrative center is the urban locality (an urban-type settlement) of Pokrovskoye. Population: 14,782 (2010 Census);  The population of Pokrovskoye accounts for 30.0% of the district's total population.

Notable residents 

Antonina Fedorovna Sofronova (1892–1966), artist and illustrator, born in Droskovo

See also
Droskovo

References

Notes

Sources

Districts of Oryol Oblast